Josselin Charles Louis Jean Marie de Rohan-Chabot, 14th Duke of Rohan CBE, known as Josselin de Rohan (born 5 June 1938 in Suresnes, Hauts-de-Seine) is a French politician.  He is a former member of the Senate of France, representing the Morbihan department as a member of the Union for a Popular Movement.

He was president of the RPR grouping in the Senate 1993–2002, and of the UMP grouping in the Senate 2002–2008.

Early life
Josselin de Rohan is a member of the House of Rohan-Chabot, the eldest son of Alain de Rohan-Chabot, 13th Duke of Rohan, and the former Hélène de Liencourt. Upon his father’s death in 1966, Josselin de Rohan succeeded him as 14th Duke of Rohan. His family residences include Josselin Castle in Morbihan.

He was educated at ENA (graduating in 1965 in the same class as Ernest-Antoine Seillière, Jean-Pierre Chevènement, Lionel Jospin and Jacques Toubon). He is now a member of the administrative council of ENA.

Career
Close to Jacques Chirac, he was elected to the Senate in 1983, and subsequently reelected in 1992 and 2001. He was also Mayor of Josselin 1965–2000, and served on the General Council of the canton of Josselin 1982–1998.

He was president of the RPR grouping in the Senate 1993–2002, and of the UMP grouping in the Senate from December 2002 until January 2008, when he stated that for him, "the hour of relief has come", though he requested "some time to hand over". He was succeeded by Henri de Raincourt. On 16 January 2008, following the death of Serge Vinçon, he was nonetheless elected President of the Senate’s Commission on Foreign Affairs, and reelected on 8 October 2008.

He served as regional President of the Brittany region from 1998 until his party's defeat by the Socialists led by Jean-Yves Le Drian in the 2004 French regional elections.

In the 2007 presidential election, Josselin de Rohan supported Nicolas Sarkozy, the UMP candidate. Because of his age, he did not stand in the 2011 senatorial election.

Personal life
On 17 November 1973, de Rohan-Chabot married Antoinette Boegner (b. 1946) in Crécy-la-Chapelle (Seine-et-Marne). Antoinette was a daughter of Jean-Marc Boegner and granddaughter of pastor Marc Boegner. Together, they are the parents of three children:

 Alain Louis Marc de Rohan-Chabot (b. 1975), manager of Tarquinia Films.
 Anne-Louise Claire Marie de Rohan-Chabot (b. 1979).
 Olivia Hélène Odilie Marie de Rohan-Chabot (b. 1986).

Ancestry

References

External links
Josselin de Rohan-Chabot, 14th Duc de Rohan
Page on the Senate website

1938 births
Living people
People from Suresnes
French Senators of the Fifth Republic
Josselin
Josselin
Josselin
Senators of Morbihan